No One Ever Really Dies (stylized as NO_ONE EVER REALLY DIES) is the fifth studio album by American hip hop and rock band N.E.R.D. The album was released on December 15, 2017 through I Am Other and Columbia Records. It features guest appearances from Rihanna, André 3000, Kendrick Lamar, M.I.A., Gucci Mane, Wale, Future and Ed Sheeran among others. It was preceded by three singles; "Lemon" with Rihanna, "1000" with Future, and "Don't Don't Do It!" with Kendrick Lamar.

No One Ever Really Dies is the group's first full-length album since 2010's Nothing.

Background
On February 6, 2017, during an interview with BBC Radio 1, Pharrell stated that "it's feeling really good, really special" about the group's return.

In October 2017, the album was teased after posters were popping up on the side of streets, and by concertgoers at the 2017 Camp Flog Gnaw Carnival.

The album was debuted with a live listening party during the first day at ComplexCon, thus revealing the tracklist. Pharrell revealed the album's cover art and release date via Instagram and Twitter on November 22, 2017.

Artwork
The album's artwork depicts a tongue with the album's title placed on top and aluminum foil on the teeth to substitute grills.

Critical reception

No One Ever Really Dies received positive reviews from music critics. At Metacritic, which assigns a normalised rating out of 100 to reviews from mainstream critics, the album has an average score of 74, based on 17 reviews, indicating "generally favorable reviews".

In a four out of five star review for AllMusic, critic Andy Kellman claimed that "Tied together with recurring declarations of "mad ethnic right now," sampled from Retch's 2016 viral clip, the album is all raucous resistance to issues ranging from anti-immigration to police brutality to transgender rights. When Williams barks "You fuckin' with survivors!" like an activist Rockwell, he perfectly summarizes the indignant optimism that dominates the best N.E.R.D album since the original version of In Search of...."

Track listing
Credits adapted from Tidal. All tracks are produced by Pharrell Williams, except where noted.

Notes
  signifies an additional producer.
  signifies an additional vocal producer.
 "Don’t Don’t Do It!" originally featured credited vocals by Frank Ocean.
 "Deep Down Body Thurst" features additional vocals by Mike Larson.
 "1000" features additional vocals by Alex DePersia, Mette Towley, Rhea Dummett and Phi Hollinger.
 "ESP" features additional vocals by Alex DePersia and Mette Towley.
 "Lightning Fire Magic Prayer" features additional vocals by Rocket Williams, Helen Williams, Rhea Dummett and Mike Larson.
 "Kites" features additional vocals by ASAP Rocky, Mary J. Blige, Rhea Dummett, Hana Hollinger, Phi Hollinger and Helen Williams.
 "Secret Life of Tigers" features additional vocals by First Summer Uika and Momose Momo of Billie Idle, and Cara Delevingne.

Personnel
N.E.R.D
 Pharrell Williams – production , executive production
 Chad Hugo – additional production , synthesizers , doorslam , synth FX , programming 
 Shay Haley

Additional musicians

 Kendrick Lamar – performance 
 Rihanna – performance 
 Gucci Mane – performance 
 Wale – performance 
 Future – performance 
 André 3000 – performance 
 M.I.A. – performance 
 Ed Sheeran – performance 
 Thundercat – bass 
 Brent Paschke – electric guitar 
 Rhea Dummett – additional vocals 
 Mike "Miguel Milliones" Larson – additional vocals , programming 
 Alex DePersia – additional vocals 
 Mette Towley – additional vocals 
 Phi Hollinger – additional vocals 
 Helen Williams – additional vocals 
 Rocket Williams – additional vocals 
 ASAP Rocky – additional vocals 
 Mary J. Blige – additional vocals 
 Hana Hollinger – additional vocals 
 First Summer Uika – additional vocals 
 Momose Momo – additional vocals 
 Cara Delevingne – additional vocals 
 Tenley Sage – native youth 
 Red Eagle Perkins – native youth 
 Amiah Fimbres – native youth 
 Precious Bernie – native youth 
 Wacantkiya Eagle – native youth 
 Mahpiya Eagle – native youth 
 Jayde Kelly – native youth 
 Chayla Warren – native youth 
 Winona Gayto – native youth 
 Ku-uipo Mauai – native youth 

Technical

 Mike Larson – recording engineer , native youth vocal production , mixing
 Andrew Coleman – recording engineer 
 James Hunt – recording engineer 
 Matt Schaeffer – recording engineer 
 Marcos Tovar – recording engineer 
 Kori Anders – recording engineer 
 Ken Oriole – recording engineer 
 Kuk Harrell – Rihanna vocal production 
 Rhea Dummett – native youth vocal production 
 Ben "Bengineer" Sedano – 2nd engineer , assistant mix engineer
 Thomas Cullison – 2nd engineer , assistant mix engineer
 Jacob Dennis – 2nd engineer 
 Jordon Silva – 2nd engineer 
 Masayuki Hara – 2nd engineer 
 Madoka Kambe – 2nd engineer 
 Hart Gunther – 2nd engineer 
 Daryl Johnson – 2nd engineer 
 Miguel DaCruz – 2nd engineer 
 Eric Eylands – 2nd engineer 
 Brendan Morawski – 2nd engineer 
 David Kim – 2nd engineer 
 Todd Hurtt – 2nd engineer 
 David Kim – 2nd engineer 
 Ramon Rivas – 2nd engineer 
 Matt Tuggle – 2nd engineer 
 Iain Findlay – 2nd engineer 
 Josh Seflers – 2nd engineer 
 John Muller – 2nd engineer 
 Sean Klein – 2nd engineer 
 David Swenson – 2nd engineer 
 Graham Thomas – 2nd engineer 
 Leslie Brathwaite – mixing
 Jon Sher – assistant mix engineer
 Tony Flores – assistant mix engineer
 Chris Athens – mastering

Release

 Caron Veazey – Pharrell Williams management
 Ron Laffitte – Pharrell Williams management
 Alex DePersia – Pharrell Williams project management
 Todd Tourso – Pharrell Williams creative direction, art direction
 Phi Hollinger – Pharrell Williams creative direction, art direction
 Pres Rodriguez – art direction
 Mike Larson – album A&R and coordination
 Jerry Edouard – album A&R and coordination
 Michelle Dupont – Chad Hugo management
 Jan Fairchild – Chad Hugo engineering
 Erik Ian – photography

Charts

References

2017 albums
N.E.R.D. albums
Albums produced by Pharrell Williams
Albums produced by Kuk Harrell
Albums produced by Chad Hugo
Columbia Records albums
New wave albums by American artists